Basilicata was a small protected cruiser built for the Italian Regia Marina (Royal Navy) in the 1910s. The Campania-class cruisers were intended for service in Italy's colonies, and so were given a heavy armament and designed to emphasize long cruising range over high speed. Basilicatas career was cut short in mid-1919 when one of her boilers exploded and sank her while in Tewfik, Egypt. The ship was raised in 1920 but deemed not worth repairing; she was sold for scrapping in July 1921.

Design

Her propulsion system consisted of a pair of vertical triple-expansion steam engines each driving a single screw propeller. Steam was supplied by four coal-fired, cylindrical fire-tube boilers that were vented into a single funnel. She had a crew of 11 officers and 193 enlisted men.

Basilicata was armed with a main battery of six  L/40 guns mounted singly; one was placed on the forecastle, one at the stern, and two on each broadside in sponsons on the main deck. She was also equipped with two  L40 guns, three 76 mm L/40 guns in anti-aircraft mountings, two  guns, and a pair of machine guns.

Service history
Basilicata was laid down at the Castellammare shipyard on 9 August 1913, the same day as Campania. Both ships were built on the same slipway. They were launched less than a year later on 23 July 1914. Fitting-out work proceeded more slowly on Basilicata, and she was completed on 1 August 1917, four months after her sister ship. After completion, Basilicata was stationed in Italian Libya.

On 13 August 1919, while moored in Tewfik at the southern end of the Suez Canal, one of Basilicatas boilers exploded, which sank the ship. Salvage operations began thereafter, and on 12 September 1920 after three days of work, the ship was refloated. The Regia Marina decided that repairing the ship was not worth the cost, and so on 1 July 1921 she was sold to ship breakers in Suez.

Notes

References

External links
 Basilicata Marina Militare website 

Campania-class cruisers
Ships built in Castellammare di Stabia
1914 ships
World War I cruisers of Italy
Maritime incidents in 1919
Ships sunk by non-combat internal explosions